Amy Joy Casselberry Cuddy (born July 23, 1972) is an American social psychologist, author and speaker. She is a proponent of "power posing", a self-improvement technique whose scientific validity has been questioned. She has served as a faculty member at Rutgers University, Kellogg School of Management and Harvard Business School. Cuddy's most cited academic work involves using the stereotype content model that she helped develop to better understand the way people think about stereotyped people and groups. Though Cuddy left her tenure-track position at Harvard Business School in the spring of 2017, she continues to contribute to its executive education programs.

Early life and education
Cuddy grew up in the small Pennsylvanian town of Robesonia. She graduated from Conrad Weiser High School in 1990.

In 1998, Cuddy earned a Bachelor of Arts in psychology, graduating magna cum laude, from the University of Colorado. 
She attended the University of Massachusetts Amherst from 1998 to 2000 before transferring to Princeton University to follow her adviser, Susan Fiske. 
She received a Master of Arts in 2003 and a Doctor of Philosophy in 2005 in social psychology (dissertation: "The BIAS Map: Behavior from intergroup affect and stereotypes") from Princeton University.

Academic career

From 2005 to 2006, Cuddy was an assistant professor of psychology at Rutgers University. In 2012, she was an assistant professor at the Kellogg School of Management at Northwestern University, where she taught leadership in organizations in the MBA program and research methods in the doctoral program. In 2013, she was an assistant professor in the Negotiation, Organizations and Markets Unit at the Harvard Business School, where she taught courses in negotiations, leadership, power and influence, and research methods. In the spring of 2017, The New York Times reported, "she quietly left her tenure-track job at Harvard", where she lectured in the psychology department.

Research

Stereotypes

In 2002, Cuddy co-authored the proposal of the stereotype content model, with Susan Fiske and Peter Glick (Lawrence University). In 2007, the same authors proposed the "Behaviors from Intergroup Affect and Stereotypes" (BIAS) Map model. 
These models propose to explain how individuals make judgments of other people and groups within two core trait dimensions, warmth and competence, and to discern how these judgments shape and motivate our social emotions, intentions, and behaviors.

Power posing 

In 2010, Cuddy, Dana Carney and Andy Yap published the results of an experiment on how nonverbal expressions of power (such as expansive, open, space-occupying postures)
affect people's feelings, behaviors, and hormone levels.
In particular, they claimed that adopting body postures associated with dominance and power ("power posing")  for as little as two minutes can increase testosterone, decrease cortisol, increase appetite for risk, and cause better performance in job interviews.  This was widely reported in popular media.
David Brooks summarized the findings, "If you act powerfully, you will begin to think powerfully."

Other researchers tried to replicate this experiment with a larger group of participants and a double-blind setup.  The experimenters found that power posing increased subjective feelings of power, but did not affect hormones or actual risk tolerance. They published their results in Psychological Science. Though Cuddy and others are continuing to carry out research into power posing, Carney has disavowed the original results. The theory is often cited as an example of the replication crisis in psychology, in which initially seductive theories cannot be replicated in follow-up experiments.

Publications
Books
In December 2015 Cuddy published a self-help book advocating power posing,  Presence: Bringing Your Boldest Self to Your Biggest Challenges, which built on the value of the outward practice of power posing to focus on projecting one's authentic self with the inward-focused concept of presence—defined as "believing in and trusting yourself – your real honest feelings, values and abilities."  
The book reached at least as high as #3 on The New York Times Best Seller list (Advice, How-To & Miscellaneous) in February 2016.
The book was translated into 32 languages.

Academic papers
 
 
 , listed among "The Top 10 Psychology Studies of 2010" by Halvorson (2010).
 Cuddy, A. J. C., Fiske, S. T., & Glick, P. (2008). Warmth and competence as universal dimensions of social perception: The Stereotype Content Model and the BIAS Map. In M. P. Zanna (Ed.), Advances in Experimental Social Psychology (vol. 40, pp. 61–149). New York, NY: Academic Press.
 
 
 

TED talk
 
 TED Talk: Amy Cuddy:  "Your body language shapes who you are" (TED Global, June 2012), about the effect of peoples' body language on their perception of how powerful they themselves are.
 PopTech Annual Conference, 'Talk of the Day' October 21, 2011

Awards and honors
 World Economic Forum Young Global Leader, 2014
 Time magazine 'Game Changer', 2012
 Rising Star Award, Association for Psychological Science (APS), 2011
 The HBR List: Breakthrough Ideas for 2009, Harvard Business Review
 Michele Alexander Early Career Award, Society for the Psychological Study of Social Issues, 2008
 BBC 100 Women, 2017: glass ceiling team

References

External links
 
 
 
 

Living people
1972 births
People from Berks County, Pennsylvania
American social psychologists
Princeton University alumni
University of Colorado alumni
BBC 100 Women